is a Japanese illustrator and manga artist. She is most notable for creating the manga adaptions of Yoshiki Tanaka light novels, Legend of the Galactic Heroes, as well as illustrating the Tokuma Shoten release of Tytania, and for the yaoi series Ai no Kusabi. She won the 21st Seiun Award for best art in 1990.

Works 

 
Role: illustrations

 
The manga edition is authored by Katsumi Michihara, and is derived from the first two volumes of the original-novel. This manga story is faithful to the original, possibly more faithful than the anime. However, there are some changes that could be considered major, e.g. the gender of a character is changed. Akira Kasahara is cooperating in drawing mechanics.
Role: story & art (original story by Tanaka Yoshiki)

 
Japanese novel written by Rieko Yoshihara, originally serialized in the yaoi magazine Shousetsu June between December 1986 and October 1987.
Role: illustrations

 
Manga by Yuu Asagi, published between 1987-2004.
Role: illustrations

 
Three japanese light novel series written by Yoshiki Tanaka between 1988 and 1991.
Role: illustrations  (Tokuma Shoten)

 
Manga written and illustrated by Michihara Katsumi, released in 1990.
Role: story & art

References

External links
http://chotto.art.coocan.jp/  
 
Entry in the Encyclopedia of Science FIction

Living people
1958 births
Japanese illustrators
Manga artists from Hiroshima Prefecture